Lygosoma opisthorhodum is a species of skink found in Indonesia.

References

Lygosoma
Reptiles described in 1910
Reptiles of Indonesia
Endemic fauna of Indonesia
Taxa named by Franz Werner
Fauna of Sumatra